Betty Norma Johnston ( Whiteman; 28 December 1927 – 9 January 2023) was an Australian cricketer. Whiteman played seven Test matches for the Australia women's national cricket team between 1948 and 1951.

Whiteman died on 9 January 2023, at the age of 95. At the time of her death, she was Australia's oldest living Test cricketer.

References

External links

1927 births
2023 deaths
Australian women cricketers
Australia women Test cricketers
People from Bathurst, New South Wales
Cricketers from New South Wales
New South Wales Breakers cricketers